Peschano-Lobovo (Pesçano-Labaw) is a rural locality (a village) in Chuvash-Kubovsky Selsoviet, Iglinsky District, Bashkortostan, Russia. The population was 110 as of 2010. There are 3 streets.

Geography 
Peschano-Lobovo is located 15 km northeast of Iglino (the district's administrative centre) by road. Kushkul is the nearest rural locality.

References 

Rural localities in Iglinsky District